The Billboard Dance Club Songs chart is a chart that ranks the best-performing singles in that category in the United States. The first number-one song of the year was by Swedish House Mafia and English rapper Tinie Tempah, with their collaboration "Miami 2 Ibiza". American singer-songwriter Katy Perry achieved three number-one songs on the chart, which included "Firework", "E.T. and "Last Friday Night (T.G.I.F.)". "E.T." ranked at number one on the 2011 Hot Dance Club Songs year end chart. Australian singer-songwriter Kylie Minogue also topped the chart three times, with the songs "Better than Today", "Higher", a collaboration with Taio Cruz and Travie McCoy, and "Put Your Hands Up (If You Feel Love)". American singer Britney Spears topped the chart three times with "Hold It Against Me", "Till the World Ends" and "I Wanna Go", from her seventh album Femme Fatale. Beyoncé and Jennifer Lopez also achieved three number one songs on the chart each, the former with "Run the World (Girls)", "Best Thing I Never Had", and "Countdown", and the latter with "On the Floor", "I'm Into You", and "Papi". off of her seventh studio album "Love?" marking a comeback for the singer. The American band Selena Gomez & the Scene also achieved three number one songs on the chart each with "A Year Without Rain", "Who Says" and "Love You like a Love Song".

Barbadian recording artist Rihanna topped the chart with four songs from three different albums; the first was French DJ David Guetta's song Who's That Chick?, from his album One More Love where Rihanna appeared as a guest vocalist, "S&M" and "California King Bed" from Rihanna's fifth album Loud, and "We Found Love"' from her sixth album Talk That Talk. "We Found Love", a collaboration with Scottish DJ Calvin Harris, was the only song to spend more than one week at number one, and topped the chart for two consecutive weeks. American singer-songwriter Lady Gaga also achieved four number one songs on the chart with "Born This Way", "Judas", "The Edge of Glory", and "You and I". British singer-songwriter Leona Lewis achieved her first number one on the chart with "Collide", a collaboration with Avicii.
These are the Billboard Hot Dance Club Play and Singles Sales number-one hits of 2011.

See also
List of number-one dance airplay hits of 2011 (U.S.)
2011 in music
List of artists who reached number one on the U.S. Dance Club Songs chart

References

2011
United States Dance Singles
Number-one dance singles